The 1974 United States Senate election in Missouri was held on November 5, 1974. Incumbent Democrat Thomas Eagleton defeated Republican nominee Thomas B. Curtis, a former U.S. Representative, with 60.07% of the vote. This was a rematch of the 1968 election, when Eagleton defeated Curtis by a narrow margin.

Primary elections
Primary elections were held on August 6, 1974.

Democratic primary

Candidates
Thomas Eagleton, incumbent United States Senator
Pat O'Brien
Lee C. Sutton, former State Representatives

Results

Republican primary

Candidates
Thomas B. Curtis, former U.S. Representative
Paul M. Robinett
Gregory Hansman

Results

General election

Candidates
Major party candidates
Thomas Eagleton, Democratic
Thomas B. Curtis, Republican

Other candidates
C.E. Talmage, Independent

Results

References

1974
Missouri
United States Senate